Spirit Of Love is the sixth album by the musical group Con Funk Shun.  It was released in 1980 on the Mercury Records label.

Track listing
"Got To Be Enough" (M. Cooper/F. Pilate)
"By Your Side" (F. Pilate)
"Curtain Call" (F. Pilate/S. Scarborough)
"Early Morning Sunshine" (C. Martin/G. DeWitty/D. Martin)
"Spirit Of Love" (P. Harrell/S. Scarborough)
"Happy Face" (M. Cooper)
"All Up To You" (K. Fuller/F. Pilate)
"Juicy" (M. Cooper)
"Honey Wild" (L. McCall/D. Thomas/L.L. McCall)
"Lovestruck 1980" (M. Cooper/T. DeWayne)

Personnel
Michael Vernon Cooper - lead and rhythm guitar, lead and background vocals
Karl Fuller - trumpet, flugelhorn, valve trombone, background vocals
Paul Harrell - all soprano, tenor and alto saxophone and flute solos, background vocals
Cedric Martin - bass guitar, lead and background vocals
Louis A. McCall - drums, syndrums, background vocals
Felton C. Pilate - slide and valve trombone, keyboards, all synthesizer solos, rhythm guitar, lead and background vocals
Danny A. Thomas - clavinet, organ, electric and acoustic pianos, synthesizer, background vocals

Charts

Singles

References

External links
 Con Funk Shun-Spirit Of Love at Discogs

1980 albums
Con Funk Shun albums
Mercury Records albums